La Coulotte Ridge is located on the border of Alberta and British Columbia on the Continental Divide. It was named after La Coulotte in France.

See also
 List of peaks on the Alberta–British Columbia border
 Mountains of Alberta
 Mountains of British Columbia

References

La Coulotte Ridge
La Coulotte Ridge
Canadian Rockies